The Lancer 29 PS is an American sailboat that was designed by Herb David as a motorsailer and a cruiser and first built in 1984. The PS designation indicates Power Sailer.

Production
The design was built by Lancer Yachts in the United States, starting in 1984 and only a small number were built. It is now out of production.

Design
The Lancer 29 PS is a recreational keelboat, built predominantly of fiberglass, with wood trim. It has a fractional sloop, a sharply raked stem, a plumb transom and a fixed long keel. It displaces .

Operational history
In a review Bruce McArthur wrote, "like the other Lancer PS models, these boats were more of a hybrid power-sailboat than a sailing auxiliary or motorsailer and can accept large outboard motors. The Lancer 29 PS was not built in great numbers."

See also
List of sailing boat types

References

External links
Photo of a Lancer 29 PS

Keelboats
Motorsailers
1980s sailboat type designs
Sailing yachts
Sailboat type designs by Herb David
Sailboat types built by Lancer Yachts